James Lavon Hurst (born June 1, 1967) is a former Major League Baseball pitcher who played in  with the Texas Rangers.

Hurst was selected in the 32nd round of the 1989 Major League Baseball draft out of Florida Southern by the Cleveland Indians. He was assigned to the Reno Silver Sox to begin his career in 1990 but was released after one minor league season in Reno. He was signed by the Rangers in July 1991 and spent the next few years in their farm system.

He made his Major League debut on Opening Day of the 1994 season on April 4 at Yankee Stadium against the New York Yankees. He pitched a scoreless inning in relief of Kevin Brown. His final Major League game would come on May 22 of the same season against the Seattle Mariners at the Kingdome.

The 1995 season was his last in professional baseball. He split time between the minor league systems of the Rangers, Baltimore Orioles and Cincinnati Reds.

References

External links
, or Retrosheet, or Pura Pelota (Venezuelan Winter League)

1967 births
Living people
Baseball players from Florida
Bowie Baysox players
Charlotte Rangers players
Florida Southern Moccasins baseball players
Gastonia Rangers players
Indianapolis Indians players
Major League Baseball pitchers
Oklahoma City 89ers players
People from Plantation, Florida
Reno Silver Sox players
Rochester Red Wings players
South Florida Panthers baseball players
Texas Rangers players
Tiburones de La Guaira players
American expatriate baseball players in Venezuela
Tulsa Drillers players
Sportspeople from Broward County, Florida